All the World's Delights (Swedish: All jordens fröjd) is a 1946 Swedish historical novel by Margit Söderholm.

Film adaptation
In 1953 it was made into a film of the same title directed by Rolf Husberg and starring Ulla Jacobsson.

References

Bibliography
 Goble, Alan. The Complete Index to Literary Sources in Film. Walter de Gruyter, 1999.
 Gaster, Adrian. The International Authors and Writers Who's Who. International Biographical Centre, 1977.

1946 Swedish novels
Swedish novels adapted into films
Swedish historical novels
Novels by Margit Söderholm
Novels set in the 19th century